Ferrall is a surname of Irish origin, presumably an anglicised form of the patronym Ó Fearghail, meaning "descendant of Fearghail", whose name means "man of valour".

People with the surname 

Sir Connell Ferrall, Irish Jacobite soldier killed in 1689
Scott Ferrall, American sports talk radio personality
R. Michael Ferrall, American politician and member of the Wisconsin State Assembly
Sir Raymond Ferrall, Australian businessman and first-class cricketer
William J. Ferrall, New York politician